Fernand Wéry (1886 – 20 August 1964) was a Belgian painter. His work was part of the painting event in the art competition at the 1936 Summer Olympics.

References

1886 births
1964 deaths
20th-century Belgian painters
Belgian painters
Olympic competitors in art competitions
People from Ixelles